Government Science College, Jabalpur is an educational institute situated in Jabalpur, Madhya Pradesh, India. It was established in 1836, making it one of the oldest colleges in India. It has been accredited with grade 'A' by NAAC. The University Grants Commission (UGC) granted it autonomous status in 1990 and heritage  status in 2015.

History

Timeline 

 1836  –  Established in the Year 1836 at Saugor (Sagar, Madhya Pradesh)
 1860  –  Collegiate School at Saugor started
 1873  –  Transferred from Saugor to Jabalpur  
 1896  –  Degree Courses in Science started
 1916  –  Named as Robertson College
 1947  -  Moved to the present campus as the previous campus was allotted to the Jabalpur Engineering College's Civil engineering department
 1947  –  After Independence the college was renamed as Mahakaushal Mahavidyalaya. Post Graduate Studies started.
 1962  –  Bifurcated into ‘Govt. Science College’ and Mahakaushal Arts & Commerce College.
 1985  –  Declared Model College by the Department of Higher Education, Government of Madhya Pradesh.
 1990  –  Granted autonomy by the UGC.
 2002  –  Declared "Centre of Excellence in Science Education" by Government of Madhya Pradesh.
 2002  –  Accredited “A” Grade by NAAC.
 2004  –  College with Potential for Excellence by the UGC.
 2011  –  Selected for FIST grant by the Department of Science & Technology.
 2015  –  Received Heritage Status from the UGC.
 2018  –  Declared institute of excellence in higher education (iehe): Government of Madhya Pradesh (02-07-2018).
 2019  –  3rd cycle NAAC accredited "A" grade.

Affiliations 
 1860–1890:    Calcutta University
 1891–1922:    Allahabad University
 1923–1946:    Nagpur University
 1947–1956:    Sagar University
 1957–present: Jabalpur University

Academics 
Government Science College, Jabalpur (MP) India has undergraduate, postgraduate and doctoral programmes; offering Bachelor of Science, Bachelor of Computer Applications,Master of Science and Doctor of Philosophy degrees in natural sciences, formal sciences, exact sciences and applied sciences.

Teaching Departments 
 Botany and Microbiology
 Chemistry and Biochemistry
 English Language
 Environmental Science
 Geology
 Hindi Language
 Mathematics and Computer Science
 Military Science
 Physics, Electronics, Computer Application and Computer Maintenance
 Zoology and Biotechnology

Alumni 
The notable alumni of the college include:
 Kunji Lal Dubey
 Veni Shankar Jha
 Ashok Kumar
 Bhawani Prasad Mishra
 Kusum Nair
 Ramkumar Verma
 Prem Nath
 Yogesh Mohan Tiwari
 Ravishankar Shukla
 Jagmohan Das
 Dwarka Prasad Mishra
 Chandulal Chandrakar
 Shiv Prasad Kosta
 Sharad Yadav
 Prahlad Singh Patel
 Rakesh Singh
 Om Prakash Dhurve

References 

1836 establishments in India
Universities in Madhya Pradesh
Universities and colleges in Madhya Pradesh